Welcome Danger is a 1929 American pre-Code comedy film directed by Clyde Bruckman and starring Harold Lloyd. A sound version and silent version were filmed. Ted Wilde began work on the silent version, but became ill and was replaced by Bruckman.

Plot

Harold Bledsoe, a student of botany, is traveling by rail to San Francisco, where the captain of police has sent for him to help investigate a crime wave in the city's "Chinatown" district. Since Harold is the son of San Francisco's former police captain, municipal authorities hope he will be as skilled as his father in solving crimes. Also traveling to the city, but by car, are a young woman named Billie Lee and her little brother Buddy, who needs his lame leg treated in San Francisco by "the famous Chinese physician" Dr. Chang Gow.

During a brief train stop in Colorado, Harold has his photograph taken at a vending machine. He is surprised to see in the print the face of an attractive woman next to his. Actually, Billie Lee had taken her photo at the same machine before him, but the film failed to develop properly, thus leaving her image on his double-exposed print. Harold's train halts again for a minor repair; and while waiting outside, he sees an unusual blossom on a nearby tree. He goes to fetch it but is unable to reach high enough, so he stands on a cow. Suddenly, the train's whistle blows, which causes the cow to bolt with Harold holding on desperately. The animal soon throws him off on a dirt road where Billie and Buddy's old car sits with an apparent engine problem. Harold does not recognize Billie as the woman on his photograph; in fact, he thinks she is a boy since she is wearing a man's cap and overalls to work on the engine. Harold tries to help, but he only complicates things and repeatedly insults Billie. After she removes the carburetor, a passing motorist suggests they check their car's gas tank, which is indeed empty. The motorist gives them some fuel; but after he leaves, Billie realizes that she left the carburetor on the other car's running board. Now they must spend the night along the roadside. Harold makes Billie do much of the work setting up camp as he sits mooning over the mysterious woman in his photograph. Billie saw earlier that it is her image, but she does not tell him. After enduring more physical and verbal abuse from Harold, she finally changes her clothes in a tent and then shocks him by reappearing in a dress. He now recognizes her and flees, embarrassed by his boorish behavior. She catches him and asks if he still thinks she is as beautiful as in the photograph; he says yes. Next morning, the trio harness the cow to pull their car to a gas station. Harold then catches another westbound train.

Once in San Francisco and at police headquarters, Harold is introduced to the process of fingerprinting, which intrigues him. He causes chaos at the station for the next two weeks by using the messy, fine black powder to take fingerprints of everyone at the building, including the print of a visitor, John Thorne, a respected citizen who is pressuring the police to crack down on crime. Harold's antics continue to anger staff at the station, so the desk sergeant hatches a scheme to get rid of him and sends him on a mission to find the "Dragon", the mysterious master of the city's Chinese underworld. To "aid" Harold in his search, the sergeant gives him Mr. Thorne's fingerprint, but he lies and tells him it is the Dragon's print.

Harold goes to Chinatown, where he sees Billie in her car. She gives him the address where she and Buddy are residing in the city. Harold then passes a flower shop and sees a beautiful potted flower he wants to purchase for Billie, but the employees refuse to sell it. Determined to have one, he throws money on the floor and dashes out of the shop with the flower and evades two employees in hot pursuit. He next visits Billie and gives her the flower. Dr. Gow is also there examining Buddy's leg. As he departs, he accidentally knocks the flower off a table and breaks its pot, revealing a package of opium. Telling them to say nothing about the drug, the doctor goes to the flower shop, where he is kidnapped. Later, Harold and Billie hear radio news that Dr. Gow had been seized and may be killed. Fearing his death would deprive Buddy of any hope of a permanent recovery, Harold leaves to rescue the doctor.

In Chinatown, Harold sees Clancy, a street cop he had met earlier; and together they go to the shop. Aware of their presence, employees there set up a series of spooky effects to frighten them from the premises; yet, Harold and Clancy remain despite being terrified. Clancy does leave briefly to call for more officers before returning. Fights then begin with Chinese gang members and continue in passageways beneath the shop. Harold wanders through the basement and soon encounters the masked Dragon and some of his men preparing to execute Dr. Gow. Harold manages to prevent this and struggles with the Dragon, who escapes with his hostage before the police burst in and arrest everyone else. When the police return to the station with Harold and gang members, Billie is already there, eager to find him. The police inform Harold about misleading him with the Dragon's fingerprint. He is mortified until he notices in a mirror that in his fight with the Dragon, the drug lord had left his sooty fingerprint on Harold's forehead, and it matches Thorne's print.

Harold tries to explain this to his colleagues, who only ridicule him. Thorne then appears at the station, and Harold instantly denounces him. As an influential public figure, Thorne is thought to be above suspicion, so the police apologize for Harold's behavior and try to detain him. He gets away and follows Thorne to his home, where he eventually extracts a confession from him. The police arrive and remain skeptical until Harold finds Dr. Gow gagged and bound in a closet in Thorne's study. Thorne is arrested, and Billie accepts Harold's clumsy proposal of marriage.

Cast
 Harold Lloyd - Harold Bledsoe 
 Barbara Kent - Billie Lee
 Noah Young - Patrick Clancy
 Charles B. Middleton - John Thorne
 Will Walling - Captain Walton
 Edgar Kennedy - Police Desk Sergeant (uncredited) 
 James Wang - Dr. Chang Gow (uncredited)
 Douglas Haig - Buddy Lee (uncredited)
 Blue Washington - Thorne's Henchman (uncredited)

Premiere
In its October 3, 1929 issue, the popular New York-based trade paper The Film Daily reports the following about the release and premiere of Welcome Danger:

Notably, the premiere took place two weeks prior to the Stock Market Crash of 1929.

Harold Lloyd's first "talkie"
Moviegoers in the United States began to hear for the first time the voices of many of their favorite stars as Hollywood released more and more "talking pictures" in 1929. Many reviewers at that time, in addition to expressing their opinions about a movie's plot and production values, provided readers with their initial impressions after hearing an actor actually speak on screen. Since Welcome Danger was Harold Lloyd's first venture into the sound era, there was significant public interest in his voice. In October 1929, the influential New York entertainment publication Variety gave overall high marks to Welcome Danger and to Barbara Kent's spoken lines but offered a somewhat mixed review regarding Lloyd's recorded dialogue:

Walter R. Greene, however, a reviewer for Motion Picture News in 1929, complimented Lloyd's stunts in Welcome Danger as well as the tone and general quality of the comedian's voice. "Harold Lloyd", Greene wrote, "has nothing to fear from talking pictures", adding "His voice registers excellently, and there is personality in its reproduction".

Preservation status
Both the silent and sound versions have been restored by the UCLA Film and Television Archive.

This film was included in Optimum's region 2 'Harold Lloyd: The Definitive Collection' 2005 box set from the U.K., but was left out of the New Line region 1 'The Harold Lloyd Comedy Collection' 2005 box set from the U.S.

The film's copyright was renewed, and will therefore not fall into the public domain until January 1, 2025.

See also
Harold Lloyd filmography

References and notes

External links

Welcome Danger  Detail View, SilentEra.com; accessed August 7, 2015.

1929 films
1929 comedy films
American comedy films
American black-and-white films
Films directed by Clyde Bruckman
Films set in San Francisco
Paramount Pictures films
Films with screenplays by Felix Adler (screenwriter)
1920s English-language films
1920s American films